The Dutch National Cyclo-cross Championships were first held in 1963 and have been held annually since then by the Royal Dutch Cycling Union. The first women event was held in 1987.

The first races were held as a combination race with both the amateurs and the professionals riding in one event. Recent years the races are run in different classes: Elite, U-23, U-18, Juvenile, Masters and Amateurs.

Elite Men Results

Elite Women Results

References

Cycle races in the Netherlands
Recurring sporting events established in 1963
1963 establishments in the Netherlands
National cyclo-cross championships